PalaMangano is an indoor sporting arena located in Scafati, Italy.  The capacity of the arena is 3,700 people and is named after former coach Massimo Mangano. It is currently home of the Scafati Basket basketball team.

Indoor arenas in Italy